Govind Singh Kunjwal is an Indian National Congress leader and member of the Uttarakhand Legislative Assembly in India. He was elected from the Jageshwar constituency in the 2002 election. He was former speaker of Uttarakhand Legislative Assembly.

He was heavily criticized for his role in Uttarakhand political trouble in 2016 where 9 MLAs from Indian National Congress changed their loyalty towards Bharatiya Janata Party.

Electoral Performances

References

Living people
Members of the Uttarakhand Legislative Assembly
Uttarakhand politicians
Indian National Congress politicians
Speakers of the Uttarakhand Legislative Assembly
Year of birth missing (living people)